The Scotland women's national under-16 basketball team is a national basketball team of Scotland, administered by the Basketballscotland. It represents the country in women's international under-16 basketball competitions.

In 1976 and 1978, the team finished 14th at the European Championship for Cadettes.

They also participated at two FIBA U16 Women's European Championship Division B tournaments and they won 11 medals at the FIBA U16 Women's European Championship Division C.

See also
Scotland women's national basketball team
Scotland women's national under-18 basketball team
Scotland men's national under-16 basketball team

References

External links
Archived records of Scotland team participations

Basketball in Scotland
Women's national under-16 basketball teams
Basketball